The First Gillard ministry (Labor) was the 65th ministry of the Australian Government and was led by the prime minister, Julia Gillard. It succeeded the first Rudd ministry upon its swearing in by the Governor-General of Australia, Quentin Bryce, on 24 June 2010. It was replaced by the second Gillard ministry on 14 September 2010 after the 2010 election.

The change in ministry followed a series of events on 23–24 June that led to the Prime Minister, Kevin Rudd, first calling a leadership ballot within the governing Labor Party after being challenged by his deputy, Julia Gillard, and then declining to contest it, allowing Gillard to win the leadership unopposed. The initial form of the First Gillard Ministry was identical to the final form of the first Rudd ministry, apart from Gillard's appointment as prime minister and Wayne Swan as deputy prime minister, and the departure of Rudd as a minister. A minor reshuffle was announced on 28 June, with Simon Crean to assume responsibility for Gillard's former portfolios of Education, Employment and Workplace Relations and Social Inclusion. Stephen Smith was assigned the Trade portfolio in addition to his Foreign Affairs portfolio.

Cabinet

Outer ministry

Parliamentary secretaries

See also
 Second Gillard Ministry

References

External links
 The Gillard cabinet with photos and ministries

Ministries of Elizabeth II
Gillard 1
21st century in Australia
Australian Labor Party ministries
2010 establishments in Australia
2010 disestablishments in Australia
Ministry 1
Cabinets established in 2010
Cabinets disestablished in 2010
2010s in Australia